Chickenhawk (chicken hawk or chicken-hawk) is a political term used in the United States to describe a person who is a war hawk yet actively avoids or avoided military service when of age. In political usage, chickenhawk is a compound of chicken (meaning 'coward') and hawk from war hawk (meaning 'someone who advocates war'). Generally, the implication is that chickenhawks lack the moral character to participate in war themselves, preferring to ask others to support, fight, and perhaps die in an armed conflict.

History
The term war hawk developed early in American history as a term for one who advocates war. On one episode of the American television show Rowan & Martin's Laugh-In that aired in 1970, Dan Rowan made the following joke:

Previously, the term war wimp was sometimes used, coined during the Vietnam War by Congressman Andrew Jacobs, a Marine veteran of the Korean War, to describe "someone who promotes waging war or building up the tools of war but hid behind a college deferment or suddenly came up lame when the draft board whistled."

The 1983 bestselling book Chickenhawk was a memoir by Robert Mason about his service in the Vietnam War, in which he was a helicopter pilot. Mason used the word as a compound oxymoron to describe both his fear of combat ("chicken") and his attraction to it ("hawk").

Commentary
James Fallows identifies the rise of chickenhawks with the distancing of the American public from the military. He says that while most Americans had experience with the military by the end of World War II, having either served or known people who had, "now the American military is exotic territory to most of the American public." He cites examples of popular media such as Apocalypse Now and The Hurt Locker as many Americans' exposure to the military.

Critics of the term chickenhawk argue that the term is used as a form of whataboutism in place of arguments against military action. Matthew Yglesias describes it as "a species of hypocrisy charge, a tempting rhetorical ploy that in practice proves almost nothing."

John Bolton, Donald Trump, and Dick Cheney  have been used as modern examples of chickenhawks.

Research 

According to a 2014 study, leaders who had military backgrounds but no combat experience were most likely to initiate conflicts and wars.

See also 
Armchair general
Armchair revolutionary
Armchair warrior

References

External links
 

Political slurs for people
People associated with war
Metaphors referring to birds
Political terminology of the United States
1970 neologisms